Bobrovskoye is a rural locality (a village) in Nyuksenskoye Rural Settlement, Nyuksensky District, Vologda Oblast, Russia. The population was 193 as of 2002. There are 5 streets.

Geography 
Bobrovskoye is located 61 km northeast of Nyuksenitsa (the district's administrative centre) by road. Zarechye is the nearest rural locality.

References 

Rural localities in Nyuksensky District